Fredrik Stefan Eaton,  (June 26, 1938 – February 20, 2021) was a Canadian businessman and philanthropist who was a member of the prominent Eaton family. He was the great-grandson of Eaton's department store founder Timothy Eaton.

Life and career
He was born in Toronto to John David Eaton and his wife, Signy Hildur Stefansson, and he was raised in the Forest Hill area. His mother was of Icelandic descent. He had three brothers – John Craig Eaton, Thor Edgar Eaton and George Ross Eaton.

In 1962, Eaton received a Bachelor of Arts degree from the University of New Brunswick and started working as a salesman at Eaton's in British Columbia. From 1977 to 1988, he was the chairman, president and CEO of Eaton's.

Eaton served as Canadian High Commissioner to the United Kingdom from 1991 to 1994. In 1993, he was appointed Chancellor of the University of New Brunswick and served for two terms of five years.

He married Catherine "Nicky" Martin and had two children – Fredrik D'Arcy Eaton, who lives in Toronto and is head of the Catherine and Fredrik Eaton Charitable Foundation, and Flora Catherine Eaton Coakley, who lives in New York City.

Eaton lived with his family in Toronto, and he also had a country estate in Caledon, Ontario, a cottage on Georgian Bay, and a winter home in Florida. He was one of the most public members of the Eaton family, and he attended social events and endowed many institutions philanthropically.

Honours
In 1990, Eaton was made an Officer of the Order of Canada for having "contributed to many aspects of Canadian life. Through his leadership in a variety of organizations, in fields as diverse as those of business, education, nature, health care and the arts, he  continued his family's tradition of exemplary service to the public." In 2001, he was awarded the Order of Ontario for his "contributions in numerous areas including health care and the arts".

References

1938 births
2021 deaths
Fredrik Eaton
University of New Brunswick alumni
Canadian university and college chancellors
Officers of the Order of Canada
Members of the Order of Ontario
High Commissioners of Canada to the United Kingdom
Businesspeople from Toronto